is a former Japanese football player. His brother is Yu Tokisaki

Playing career
Rui Tokisaki played for Fukushima United FC from 2007 to 2014.

References

External links

1982 births
Living people
Meiji University alumni
Association football people from Fukushima Prefecture
Japanese footballers
J3 League players
Japan Football League players
Fukushima United FC players
Association football defenders